Elijah Taylor (born 1 May 2001) is a former Australian rules footballer who played for the Sydney Swans in the Australian Football League (AFL). He was recruited by the Sydney Swans with the 36th draft pick in the 2019 AFL draft. Taylor is an Indigenous Australian.

Early football
Taylor played for his school side at Lynwood Senior High School, as well as for Perth in the Western Australian Football League, and was selected to play for Western Australia in the AFL Under 18 Championships.

AFL career
Taylor debuted in the 7th round of the 2020 AFL season, against the Gold Coast Suns. In his first game, he picked up 9 disposals and a mark.

Taylor was stood down for the remainder of the 2020 season and his club was fined for breaking state law of COVID-19  restrictions after he smuggled his partner into Sydney Swans team hub before Round 12.

Taylor was officially stood down by the Swans on 15 September 2020 following his arrest and pleading guilty to aggravated assault charges against his ex-partner. The Swans parted ways with Taylor on 30 November 2020.

References

External links

2001 births
Living people
Sydney Swans players
Australian rules footballers from Perth, Western Australia